Hampden Township is a township in Coffey County, Kansas, United States. As of the 2000 census, its population was 114.

Geography
According to the USGS, it contains two cemeteries: Sherwood and Stringtown.

Mathias Lake is within this township. The stream of Wolf Creek runs through this township.

Wolf Creek Generating Station, a 1250MW nuclear power plant, operates here.

Transportation
Hampden Township contains one airport or landing strip, Wolf Creek Airport.

References
 USGS Geographic Names Information System (GNIS)

External links
 US-Counties.com
 City-Data.com

Townships in Coffey County, Kansas
Townships in Kansas